Mill Green is a hamlet in civil parish of Ingatestone and Fryerning, in the Brentwood district, in the English county of Essex. It is near the town of Ingatestone and the village of Fryerning. There is a wood called Millgreen Wood and a mill called Mill Green Mill.

The Viper public house at The Common, is on the Campaign for Real Ale's National Inventory of Historic Pub Interiors.

References 

 A-Z Essex (page 84)

Hamlets in Essex
Borough of Brentwood